Mandla Ndlovu is a South African politician who has been Mpumalanga's Member of the Executive Council (MEC) for Public Works, Roads and Transport since October 2022. He previously served as the MEC for Cooperative Governance and Traditional Affairs May 2022 until October 2022. He has been a member of the Mpumalanga Provincial Legislature since May 2022. Ndlovu is the provincial chairperson of the African National Congress in Mpumalanga.

Background
Ndlovu studied to become an educator. He served as an ANC councillor and as a member of the mayoral committee (MMC) at the Bushbuckridge Local Municipality. He was the regional secretary of the ANC's Bohlabelo region, which is now part of the ANC's Ehlanzeni region. At the ANC's provincial elective conference in December 2015, he was elected as the provincial secretary of the party. After ANC provincial chairperson David Mabuza resigned from the position to take up the position of national ANC deputy president in early 2018, Ndlovu was appointed to serve as the acting provincial chairperson until the next provincial elective conference.

On 2 April 2022, Ndlovu was elected as the ANC's provincial chairperson for a full term. He defeated former provincial secretary, Lucky Ndinisa, for the position with 440 votes to Ndinisa's 278 votes.

Provincial government
On 3 May 2022, the provincial ANC announced that Ndlovu would be taking up the newly elected provincial secretary Muzi Chirwa's seat in the Mpumalanga Provincial Legislature since Chirwa resigned to serve as the provincial secretary full-time. He was sworn in as an MPL on 5 May 2022.

On 10 May 2022, Mpumalanga premier Refilwe Mtsweni-Tsipane announced that she had appointed Ndlovu as the Member of the Executive Council (MEC) for Cooperative Governance and Traditional Affairs, replacing Busisiwe Shiba, who was moved to the agriculture portfolio.

On 7 October 2022, Mtsweni-Tsipane conducted a reshuffle of her executive. Ndlovu was moved to the Public Works, Roads and Transport portfolio, succeeding Mohita Latchminarain, who had been dropped from the executive council.

References

Year of birth missing (living people)
Place of birth missing (living people)
People from Mpumalanga
Members of the Mpumalanga Provincial Legislature
African National Congress politicians
21st-century South African politicians
South African educators
Living people